The 2022–23 Northeastern Huskies women's ice hockey season will represent Northeastern University during the 2022–23 NCAA Division I women's ice hockey season.

Offseason

Recruiting

Departures

Regular season

Standings

Schedule 

|-
!colspan=13 style="  "| Regular Season
|-

|-
!colspan=12 style=";" | 

|-
!colspan=12 style=";" |

Roster

References 

Northeastern Huskies women's ice hockey seasons
Northeastern
Northeastern
Northeastern
NCAA women's ice hockey Frozen Four seasons